Hosea Hunt Rockwell (May 31, 1840 – December 18, 1918) was an American lawyer and politician who served one term as a U.S. Representative from New York from 1891 to 1893.

Biography 
Born in Lawrenceville, Pennsylvania, Rockwell attended the common schools.
He served as a private in the Twenty-third Regiment, New York Volunteers, in 1861 and 1862.
He studied law.
He was admitted to the bar in 1869 and commenced practice in Elmira, New York.

Political career 
He was a member of the New York State Assembly (Chemung Co.) in 1877.
City attorney of Elmira.

Congress 
Rockwell was elected as a Democrat to the 52nd United States Congress, holding office from March 4, 1891, to March 3, 1893.

Later career 
He served as delegate to the 1896 Democratic National Convention.
He served as chairman of the Democratic State convention in 1896.
He resumed the practice of law in Elmira, New York.

Death and burial 
He died in Elmira, New York, December 18, 1918.
He was interred in Woodlawn Cemetery.

Sources

External links
 

1840 births
1918 deaths
United States Army soldiers
Democratic Party members of the New York State Assembly
Politicians from Elmira, New York
Democratic Party members of the United States House of Representatives from New York (state)
19th-century American politicians